Saulsville is an unincorporated community in Wyoming County, West Virginia, United States that has a population of about 140. Saulsville is where Twin Falls State Park is located. Saulsville has a gas station and is also home to the Wyoming County branch of Southern West Virginia Community College, a Logan County based 2 year community college. 

The community was named after James Sauls, a local letter carrier.

References

Unincorporated communities in West Virginia
Unincorporated communities in Wyoming County, West Virginia